William Sidney Thomas Paget (4 March 1909 – 1960) was a Welsh professional footballer who played as a forward. He played in the Football League for Cardiff City and Newport County and later played for non-league side Barry.

References

1909 births
1960 deaths
Welsh footballers
Footballers from Cardiff
Cardiff City F.C. players
Newport County A.F.C. players
Leyton Orient F.C. players
Barry Town United F.C. players
English Football League players
Association football forwards